is an FM radio station in Okinawa, Japan. The station is an affiliate of the Japan FM Network (JFN). It started broadcasting on September 1, 1984, replacing its existing AM radio station  which started broadcasting in February 1958.

The station is also receivable at Yoronjima in Kagoshima Prefecture and parts of the Amami Islands. Some of the station's programs are also broadcast on FM Miyako (76.5 MHz), a community FM radio station for the Miyako-jima island due to no relay transmitters in Sakishima Islands and Daito Island.

The station is also receivable in Honshu in good conditions during Sporadic E layer outbreak layer conditions which happen from the middle of May until late June.

The station broadcasts 24 hours a day which starts at 5:00 am every day. However the station will be closed for maintenance between 1:00 and 5:00 am on Monday early mornings (Sunday late night).

External links
FM OKINAWA 

Radio in Japan
Companies based in Okinawa Prefecture